The West Yosemite League is a high school athletic league that is part of the CIF Central Section.

Members
 Dinuba High School
 Hanford High School
 Lemoore High School
 Mission Oak High School
 Tulare Union High School
 Tulare Western High School

References

CIF Central Section